The Little Red Schoolhouse on Shaw Island, Washington was listed on the National Register of Historic Places in 1973.

In 1971 it was still in use as a one-room schoolhouse.

However, a room was recently added to serve as a computer center, expanding it to two rooms.  The building serves elementary and middle school students.  It serves students up to eighth grade.

It is located at the corner of Hoffman Cove and Neck Point Cove Rd.

References

School buildings on the National Register of Historic Places in Washington (state)
Buildings and structures in San Juan County, Washington
National Register of Historic Places in San Juan County, Washington